The Walvis Bay Export Processing Zone (WBEPZMC) is a free trade zone in the coastal city of Walvis Bay, Namibia. Rather than being a specific area or complex, the Zone encompasses the entire city. The Walvis Bay EPZ was opened in 1996, two years after the city rejoined Namibia.

References

Special economic zones
Walvis Bay
Economy of Namibia
1996 establishments in Namibia
1996 in Namibia